Vasily Mikhailovich Egorov (born 16 September 1993 in Megino-Kangalassky District, Yakutia, Russia) is a Russian boxer of Yakut descent in Light flyweight category. He won silver at the 2015 World Championships and gold at the 2015 European Championships.

Career 
Egorov is born in the village of Hara in Megino-Kangalassky District, Yakutia. He started boxing after his elder brother, Nikolai took up boxing.

At the 2013 Russian Championships. Egorov began competing in the category up to 49 kg. He reached the finals but lost to Balik Galanov. Thus, Egorov won a silver medal in the senior level at the Russian Nationals.

At the 2014 Russian Championships up to 49 kg. In the 1/8 finals he defeated Gore Hakobyan. In the quarterfinals, he defeated Ivan Varlamov. In the semifinals, he defeated 2012 Olympic bronze medalist David Ayrapetyan and in the final, he defeated Alexander Samoilov, becoming the Russian National champion.

In 2015, he won gold at the 2015 European Championships and in October, Egorov competed in his first Worlds at the 2015 AIBA World Boxing Championships in Doha, Qatar but lost in the finals to Cuban, Joahnys Argilagos.

References

External links
 
 
 
 Vasilii Egorov at World Series of Boxing
 Vasiliy Egorov at The-Sports.org

1993 births
Living people
Russian male boxers
Light-flyweight boxers
AIBA World Boxing Championships medalists
Olympic boxers of Russia
Boxers at the 2016 Summer Olympics
World boxing champions
Yakut people
People from Yakutsk
Sportspeople from Sakha